The Italian concession of Tianjin was a small territory (concession) in central Tianjin (formerly romanized as Tientsin), China, controlled by the Kingdom of Italy between 1901 and 1943, officially ceded to China in 1947.

Characteristics 

On 7 September 1901, Italy was granted a concession of 46 hectares in Tientsin from the Chinese government. On 7 June 1902, the Italians took control of the concession, which was to be administered by an Italian consul.

After the First World War, Italy desired to add the former Austro-Hungarian concession which was adjacent to the Italian concession, and would have doubled its size. However, in 1917 China terminated the leases of Germany and Austria-Hungary's concessions. The districts were converted into "Special Areas" under Chinese control, with a separate administration from the rest of Tientsin.

Italy requested again the Austrian concession at the end of First World War and obtained it in 1920. It returned to Chinese authorities when the Second Special Area (the former Austrian concession) was in danger of war and occupation during the Chinese Civil War.

The Italian concession became the headquarters of the Italian Legione Redenta that fought in 1919 during the Allied intervention against Soviet troops in Siberia and Manchuria. In 1935, the Italian concession had a population of about 6,261, including 110 Italian civilians and about 536 foreigners.

The Regia Marina (Italian Royal Navy) stationed some vessels at Tientsin, such as the river gunboats Carlotto and Caboto.

History 

During the Boxer Rebellion in 1900, the Beijing Legation Quarter became the center of an international incident during the Siege of the International Legations by the Boxers for several months.  After the siege had been broken by the Eight-Nation Alliance (that included Italy) at the end of the Battle of Peking, the foreign powers obtained the right to station troops to protect their legations under the terms of the Boxer Protocol. In addition, Italy obtained the concession in Tientsin, southeast of Beijing.

On 7 September 1901, a concession in Tientsin was ceded to the Kingdom of Italy by the Qing dynasty of China.  On 7 June 1902, the concession was taken into Italian possession and administered by an Italian consul: the first was Cesare Poma and the last (in 1943) was Ferruccio Stefanelli.

Along with the other foreign concessions, the Italian concession lay on the Pei Ho, southeast of the city centre.

In the late 1920s, the Italians even held small forts such as the Forte di Shan Hai Kuan near the Great Wall of China in Manchuria and in Hankow.

In 1925, Benito Mussolini created the Battaglione italiano in Cina and quartered it with soldiers of the San Marco Regiment in the new Caserma Ermanno Carlotto. The police were Chinese, while the officers were Italians. There was even a football team in the Italian concession.

During World War II, the Italian concession in Tientsin had a garrison of approximately 600 Italian troops. On 9 September 1943, after the publication of the Italian armistice with the Allies, the concession was occupied by the Imperial Japanese Army without fighting and the Italians interned at Tangshan. In November, they were given the choice to give their allegiance to Mussolini's new Italian Social Republic. Those that did received back their personal weapons and were used by the Japanese as labour troops.

In July 1944, the Italian Social Republic formally relinquished the concession to the Wang Jingwei's Japanese-sponsored Reorganized National Government of China which, like the RSI in Axis-held northern Italy, was not recognized by the Kingdom of Italy, the Republic of China, or most other nations. The Wang Jingwei government fell when the Empire of Japan was defeated.  At the same time, the Italian commercial concessions in the Shanghai International Settlement, Hankou and Beijing were ceded to the Republic of China.

On 2 June 1946, the Kingdom of Italy became the Italian Republic and, on 10 February 1947, by virtue of the peace treaty with the Allied powers, the Italian concession was formally ceded by Italy to Chiang Kai-shek's Republic of China.

Governors 
During the Italian presence, the following governors succeeded each other:
  (1901–1903)
 Giuseppe Chiostri (1904–1906)
 Oreste Da Vella (1906–1911)
 Vincenzo Fileti (1912–1920)
 Marcello Roddolo (1920–1921)
 Luigi Gabrielli di Quercita (1921–1924)
  (1925–1927)
  (1927–1932)
  (1932–1938)
  (1938–1943)

See also 
 Concessions in Tianjin
 Concessions of Italy in China
 Map of concessions in Tianjin 
 Italian Empire
 List of former foreign enclaves in China

Notes

Bibliography 

 Cucchi, Giuseppe. Una bandiera italiana in Cina, Rivista Militare, n. 6/1986.
 De Courten, Ludovica, Sargeri, Giovanni. Le Regie truppe in Estremo Oriente, 1900-1901. Ufficio Storico Stato Maggiore dell’Esercito, Roma, 2005.
 Dikötter, Frank. The Age of Openness China before Mao University of Chicago Press. Berkeley, 2008 .
 Donati, Sabina. Italy’s Informal Imperialism in Tianjin during the Liberal Epoch, 1902-1922, The Historical Journal, Cambridge University Press, 2016, available on CJO2016, doi:10.1017/S0018246X15000461.
 Grasselli, Enrico. L’esercito italiano in Francia e in Oriente Corbaccio ed. Milano, 1934.
 Marinelli, Maurizio, Andornino, Giovanni. Italy’s Encounter with Modern China: Imperial dreams, strategic ambitions, New York: Palgrave Macmillan, 2014.
 Marinelli, Maurizio. “The Triumph of the Uncanny: Italians and Italian Architecture in Tianjin”, In Cultural Studies Review, Vol. 19, 2, 2013, 70-98.
 Marinelli, Maurizio. “The Genesis of the Italian Concession in Tianjin: A Combination of Wishful Thinking and Realpolitik”. Journal of Modern Italian Studies, 15 (4), 2010: 536-556.
 Mautone, Antonio. Trentini ed Italiani contro l'Armata Rossa. La storia del corpo di spedizione in Estremo Oriente e dei Battaglioni Neri. Temi editrice. Trento, 2003.

Tientsin
Tientsin
20th century in Tianjin
1901 establishments in the Italian Empire
1947 disestablishments in the Italian Empire
China–Italy relations